Crested Butte is a home rule municipality located in Gunnison County, Colorado, United States. The town population was 1,639 at the 2020 United States Census. The former coal mining town is now called "the last great Colorado ski town". Crested Butte is a destination for skiing, mountain biking, and outdoor activities.

The Colorado General Assembly in 1990 designated Crested Butte the wildflower capital of Colorado.

History 
The East River Valley where Crested Butte is located was once used as a summer residence by the Ute people. However, they were quickly displaced when European-Americans first entered the area. The first white people to explore the valley were beaver trappers, shortly followed by surveyors. Captain John Gunnison, after whom Gunnison County is named, was one of the early explorers to enter the area.

In the 1860s and 1870s coal and silver mines began to open in the surrounding area, and many little mining towns formed. However, when silver mining began to decline, many of these towns failed. Crested Butte, however, was in a better position to survive because it served as a supply town to the surrounding area.

Another industry that served to support Crested Butte was ranching.

When the coal mines closed, the town began to shrink, and eventually the local high school was closed. Students had to travel to Gunnison to go to high school. The town did not revive until a ski area was built on Crested Butte Mountain in the 1960s. From the 1960s to 1990, the Crested Butte public school only facilitated K-5 students, while 6th grade and higher attended school in Gunnison. In 1990 Crested Butte offered middle school in the railroad depot building. In 1992 a new middle school was completed which allowed the public school to facilitate grades K through 8. Finally in 1997, a new facility for the Crested Butte Community School was completed. This included the addition of a public high school so that the school now serves students in grades K-12.

In 1993 the Crested Butte Academy opened in Crested Butte, bringing a private high school into town. However, on 9 July 2008, the academy was closed permanently due to financial difficulties that had plagued its entire existence.

Since the 1970s, several companies have attempted to mine molybdenum on Mount Emmons (called the "Red Lady") near Crested Butte. In 1977 W Mitchell was elected mayor of Crested Butte and led a campaign which stopped AMAX (now Freeport-McMoRan) from building a billion-dollar molybdenum mine on Mount Emmons. Because of his battle against the anticipated environmental impact, Mitchell is known as the man who "saved a mountain". The same year, 1977, saw the formation of the High Country Citizens' Alliance (HCCA), an environmental organization dedicated to protecting natural resources within the Upper Gunnison River Valley.

Currently the rights for Mount Emmons molybdenum are owned by U.S. Energy Corp. On 25 April 2011, Thomson Creek Metals announced that it had terminated its option agreement with U.S. Energy Corp. to acquire an interest in the Mount Emmons molybdenum project. Although US Energy continued to maintain its commitment to moving the project forward on its own behalf, the withdrawal of Thomson Creek Metals was heralded as a major victory in the town of Crested Butte in its battle against the proposed molybdenum mine.

Geography 
Crested Butte is in north-central Gunnison County on the west side of the valley of the Slate River, along Coal Creek. Colorado State Highway 135 runs south from Crested Butte  to Gunnison, the county seat.

Climate
Climate type is dominated by the winter season, a long, bitterly cold period with short, clear days, relatively little precipitation in the form of rain, but massive amounts in the form of snow, and low humidity.  The Köppen Climate Classification sub-type for this climate is Dfc (Dry-Summer Continental Subarctic Climate).

Demographics

As of the census of 2000, there were 1,529 people, 692 households, and 253 families residing in the town. The racial makeup of the town was 97.19% White, 0.26% African American, 0.92% Native American, 0.72% Asian, 0.00% Pacific Islander, 0.46% from other races, and 0.46% from two or more races. 2.75% of the population were Hispanic or Latino of any race.

There were 692 households, out of which 19.1% had children under the age of 18 living with them, 28.9% were married couples living together, 5.1% had a female householder with no husband present, and 63.3% were non-families. 28.3% of all households were made up of individuals, and 1.4% had someone living alone who was 65 years of age or older. The average household size was 2.21 and the average family size was 2.69.

In the town, the population was spread out, with 13.5% under the age of 18, 11.5% from 18 to 24, 55.6% from 25 to 44, 17.5% from 45 to 64, and 1.9% who were 65 years of age or older. The median age was 31 years. For every 100 females, there were 124.5 males. For every 100 females age 18 and over, there were 131.9 males.

The median income for a household in the town was $41,250, and the median income for a family was $49,118. Males had a median income of $27,386 versus $23,073 for females. The per capita income for the town was $26,789. 11.4% of the population and 2.7% of families were below the poverty line. Out of the total population, 3.5% of those under the age of 18 and 0.0% of those 65 and older were living below the poverty line.

Arts and culture

Festivals
Crested Butte hosts a number of festivals and parades throughout the year. These include Torchlight, New Years, Winter Carnival, Butte Bash College Ski Week and Mardi Gras during the winter months; Extreme Board Fest, Slushuck and Flauschink during spring; the Crested Butte Bike Week, Crested Butte Music Festival, Crested Butte International Film Festival, 4th of July, the Crested Butte Wildflower Festival, Alpenglow Concert Series, Festival of the Arts and Ball Bash during summer; and Fall Fest, Vinotok and Paragon Peoples' Fair during fall.

Parks and recreation
The town of Crested Butte has a Nordic Center which has an ice skating rink as well as cross-country skiing trails.

The Mountain Bike Hall of Fame was located in Crested Butte before moving in 2014 to Fairfax, California.

Media
Movies filmed in Crested Butte include Snowball Express (1972), Snowbeast (1977), The Further Adventures of the Wilderness Family (1978), and Ink (2009).

Infrastructure
Crested Butte is served by the Gunnison–Crested Butte Regional Airport in Gunnison.

In popular culture
James Cameron's film Avatar (2009) has similarities with Crested Butte in regard to both mining issues and environmental coexistence. Both the film's protagonist and the former mayor W Mitchell, who led the fight against a proposed molybdenum mine on Mount Emmons in the late 1970s, uses a wheelchair.

See also

Colorado
Bibliography of Colorado
Index of Colorado-related articles
Outline of Colorado
List of counties in Colorado
List of municipalities in Colorado
List of places in Colorado
Crested Butte
Crested Butte Film Festival
Crested Butte Mountain Resort
National Register of Historic Places listings in Gunnison County, Colorado
West Elk Mountains

References

Further reading

External links

 Town of Crested Butte website

Towns in Gunnison County, Colorado
Historic districts on the National Register of Historic Places in Colorado
Towns in Colorado
National Register of Historic Places in Gunnison County, Colorado